Houlberg was the name of a light touring car built by Christian Houlberg in Odense, Denmark, between 1913 and 1920. The car had a 4-cylinder Ballot engine. A modified, "sports" version was also offered.

External link/Reference 
 http://www.gtue-oldtimerservice.de

Vehicles of Denmark
Cars introduced in 1913